Elvir Bolić (born 10 October 1971) is a Bosnian former footballer who played as a striker.

He spent most of his 18-year professional career in Turkey, appearing for seven clubs including Galatasaray and Fenerbahçe. He also played three years in Spain, with Rayo Vallecano.

Bolić represented Bosnia and Herzegovina during one full decade.

Club career

Čelik / Red Star
Born in Zenica, SR Bosnia and Herzegovina, SFR Yugoslavia, Bolić started playing with local NK Čelik, being one of the players in the club that would later represent the independent Bosnian national team, including Senad Brkić, Mirsad Hibić and Nermin Šabić.

In December 1991, Bolić was acquired by Yugoslav powerhouse Red Star Belgrade – defending champions of the European Cup – after impressing managers Vladimir Cvetković and Dragan Džajić. He scored two goals in 11 games in the Yugoslav First League in his only season.

While at the Yugoslav national side's training camp in France, in June of the following year, 21-year-old Bolić received bad news from his family about the deteriorating situation in Bosnia and the start of the military conflict. He informed the club's directors that he would not be coming back to Belgrade, and he left to Turkey to meet with his agent; Red Star respected his wish, and he subsequently signed with Galatasaray SK.

Turkey
Bolić moved to Turkey in the summer of 1992, and remained in the nation and its Süper Lig for the following eight years. He started with Galatasaray, going on to represent Gaziantepspor and Fenerbahçe SK, winning the national championship in his first season with the latter team and also reaching the final of the Turkish Cup.

On 30 October 1996, Bolić broke Manchester United's 40-year unbeaten home record playing for Fenerbahçe in Europe when he scored the game's only goal at Old Trafford in the season's UEFA Champions League group stage, where he also netted against SK Rapid Wien (1–1 away draw).

Late career
Bolić started the 2000s in Spain with Rayo Vallecano, spending three seasons in La Liga with the club and at times forming part of a forward line with another Bosnian and a Basque who all had similar names: 'Baljić, Bolić and Bolo'. In his first year he scored eight in 32 matches, adding seven in the campaign's UEFA Cup to help the Madrid outskirts side reach the quarterfinals, even though four of those came in a 10–0 away routing of amateurs Constel·lació Esportiva.

In 2003, Bolić returned to Turkey for another lengthy spell, joining Istanbulspor in late July. At the end of the season he left for Gençlerbirliği SK, finishing his second stint in the country with Malatyaspor and İstanbulspor.

Bolić started 2006–07 in Croatia with NK Rijeka, but left in September 2006, retiring shortly after at the age of 35.

International career
 
Bolić earned 51 caps for Bosnia and Herzegovina, scoring 22 goals. He made his debut in 1996 against Greece and, at the time of his retirement, ranked third in international goals for his country, only trailing Edin Džeko and Zvjezdan Misimović.

On 8 September 2004, Bolić netted the equalizer in a 1–1 home draw with Spain for the 2006 FIFA World Cup qualifiers. His final international was a September 2006 European Championship qualification match against Hungary.

He later briefly worked as assistant coach to the national team, being part of Meho Kodro's coaching staff and leaving his post on 17 May 2008.

International goals

Honours

Club
Galatasaray
Süper Lig: 1992–93
Turkish Cup: 1992–93

Fenerbahçe
Süper Lig: 1995–96

References

External links

Stats at Liga de Fútbol Profesional 

1971 births
Living people
Sportspeople from Zenica
Association football forwards
Yugoslav footballers
Bosnia and Herzegovina footballers
Bosnia and Herzegovina international footballers
NK Čelik Zenica players
Red Star Belgrade footballers
Galatasaray S.K. footballers
Gaziantepspor footballers
Fenerbahçe S.K. footballers
Rayo Vallecano players
İstanbulspor footballers
Gençlerbirliği S.K. footballers
Malatyaspor footballers
HNK Rijeka players
Yugoslav First League players
Yugoslav Second League players
Süper Lig players
La Liga players
TFF First League players
Croatian Football League players
Bosnia and Herzegovina expatriate footballers
Bosnia and Herzegovina emigrants to Turkey
Expatriate footballers in Turkey
Bosnia and Herzegovina expatriate sportspeople in Turkey
Naturalized citizens of Turkey
Expatriate footballers in Spain
Bosnia and Herzegovina expatriate sportspeople in Spain
Expatriate footballers in Croatia
Bosnia and Herzegovina expatriate sportspeople in Croatia
Bosniaks of Bosnia and Herzegovina
Turkish people of Bosnia and Herzegovina descent